Marylou Tibaldo-Bongiorno and Jerome Bongiorno are husband-and-wife filmmakers based in Newark, New Jersey, USA.  Marylou is a producer, director and screenwriter who received her MFA from the graduate film program at New York University. Jerome is a cinematographer, editor, animator and screenwriter.

Their award winning films include the 3Rs trilogy of documentaries on urban America: Revolution '67 on the 1967 Newark riots/rebellion; The Rule, on the highly successful urban school model of Newark Abbey and Saint Benedict's Preparatory School (screened by the White House Initiative on Educational Excellence for African Americans at the U.S. Department of Education), both broadcast nationally on PBS, and Rust, on solutions to inner city poverty. Their Emmy-nominated documentary Mother-Tongue: Italian American Sons & Mothers featured Martin Scorsese, John Turturro, Rudy Giuliani and Pat DiNizio.

The Bongiornos' museum installations in 3D are New Work: Art in 3D which began with Newark in 3D, commissioned and exhibited by the Newark Museum from 2009 to 2010 and reinstalled in 2016, and installed at Newark Liberty International Airport from 2013 to 2014 as the airport's first art film; The Brooklyn Waterfront in 3D, presented by the Museum of the City of New York in 2010; and SI3D (Staten Island in 3D) commissioned and exhibited by the Staten Island Museum from 2015 to 2017.

They created and hosted the Watermark (fiction film) Conference at Wingspread and the Newark Poverty Reduction Conference at Rutgers University and presented solutions to poverty at TEDxNJIT.

The Bongiornos were recipients of film fellowships at the MacDowell Colony.

Fictional films
The Black Monk: a Chekhov inspired feature, is being used to teach psychosis in medical schools.

References

External links 
 Bongiorno Productions -  Filmmakers’ Company website
 Revolution ’67 - film’s website
 Revolution '67 - PBS's America Reframed site dedicated to the film
 Revolution '67 - PBS's POV site dedicated to the film
  The Rule - PBS's site dedicated to the film
 The Rule - film's website
 Mother-Tongue: Italian American Sons & Mothers - film's website
 New Work: Newark in 3D - Newark Museum podcast
 New Work: Art in 3D - films' website
 Newark Poverty Reduction Conference - conference website
 Marylou & Jerome Bongiorno: Reduce Poverty in Inner Cities - TEDxNJIT talk

American filmmakers
Living people
Filmmaking duos
Writers from Newark, New Jersey
Year of birth missing (living people)